Punta el Saco Airport ,  is an airport on the south shore of Isla Mocha, a small Pacific island  off the coast of Chile. Isla Mocha is part of Chile's Bío Bío Region.

The airport is in a narrow strip between the rocky shore and the coast road. Approach and departures are mostly over the water. There is a large hill northeast of the runway.

There are no published radio navaids on the island.

See also

Transport in Chile
List of airports in Chile

References

External links
OpenStreetMap - Punta El Saco
OurAirports - Punta El Saco
FallingRain - Punta El Saco Airport

Airports in Chile
Airports in Biobío Region